Tutilo Burger OSB (born 8 September 1965, Löffingen, as Heinz Burger) is a German Benedictine. He took as his monastic name Tutilo, after the saint, monk and composer Tuotilo. Since 2011 he has been the eleventh archabbot of Beuron Archabbey, whilst his elder brother Stephan Burger is Archbishop of Freiburg.

External links
http://press.vatican.va/content/salastampa/it/bollettino/pubblico/2014/05/30/0393/00891.html

People from Löffingen
German abbots
Benedictine abbots
German Benedictines
Living people
1965 births